The Congo–Ocean Railway (COR;) links the Atlantic port of Pointe-Noire (now in the Republic of Congo) with Brazzaville, a distance of . It bypasses the rapids on the lower Congo River; from Brazzaville, river boats are able to ascend the Congo River and its major tributaries, including the Oubangui River to Bangui.

 the railroad was regularly operating freight and passenger services along the length of the line despite the poor state of the track. A luxury passenger train, La Gazelle, using Korean-manufactured passenger cars, was introduced in 2012; as of 2014 it operated between Pointe-Noire and Brazzaville every other day, and was scheduled to take 14–16 hours to complete the  journey.

History 

Under French colonial administration, in 1921 they contracted Société de Construction des Batignolles to construct the railway using forced labour, recruited from what is now southern Chad and the Central African Republic. Like Spain and Portugal, France did not ratify the International Labour Organization Forced Labour Convention of 1930, No. 29. Disdain among the native population towards this conscripted labour and other forms of oppression led to the Kongo-Wara rebellion between 1928 and 1931. Through the period of construction until 1934 there was a continual heavy cost in human lives, with total deaths estimated in excess of 17,000 of the construction workers, from a combination of both industrial accidents and diseases including malaria. In 1946, France ratified the Forced Labour Convention, in light of a permanent state of emergency, due to indigenous revolt.

In 1962, a branch was constructed to Mbinda near the border with Gabon, to connect with the COMILOG Cableway and thus carry manganese ore to Pointe-Noire. The Cableway closed in 1986 when neighbouring Gabon built its own railway to haul this traffic. The branch line remains active nonetheless.

The Congo–Ocean Railway was a user of the Golwé locomotive.  Motive power is now provided by diesel locomotives.

From the start of the civil war in 1997, the line was closed for six years.

Operations restarted in 2004, but in August 2007 BBC News reported that COR was in a "decrepit state, with the majority of trains now broken", after UNICEF had organised a train to distribute malaria nets. In 2007, a Korean-led consortium CMKC Group signed a deal to build railway extensions to Ouesso and Djambala mainly for timber traffic.

On 21 June 2010, a train of the Congo–Ocean Railroad was involved in a major accident, in which at least 60 people were killed. The train is believed to have derailed as it went round a curve in a remote area between Bilinga and Tchitondi, throwing four carriages into a ravine. The dead and wounded were taken to hospitals and morgues in Pointe-Noire.

In 2011, it was announced that Africa Iron was close to concluding a 25-year ore transport deal with Congo–Ocean. In early 2015 the Congo–Ocean Railway purchased 10 EMD GT38AC locomotives from Electro-Motive Diesel in Muncie, Indiana. They were put into service by the summer of 2015.

In 2021 a proposal was announced for a Mayoko & Niari - Pointe-Noire railway for iron ore traffic.

Stations served

Specifications 
The line includes the  Bamba tunnel and 14 large reinforced concrete viaducts. The steepest eastbound gradients are 1 in 67, the steepest westbound 1 in 50. The initial locomotives were 2-8-2 tender and articulated tank engines with six driving axles. There were also 2 4-wheel petrol cars for engineers and an 18-passenger Micheline and another Micheline for the Governor General.

 Track gauge :  gauge
 Brake (railway): Vacuum brake
 Coupler:  SA3 coupler

Operations
The COR is a state-owned enterprise whose privatization was planned as part of the commitments made by the Congolese government to the World Bank and the International Monetary Fund. Among the candidates were several consortia, including Congo-Rail (Bolloré Investments, Maersk, SNCF), and the South African consortium Sheltam Mvela.

Railway links to adjacent countries 
  Democratic Republic of the Congo – no – same gauge  – proposed road-rail bridge.
  Angola (Cabinda) – no lines in Cabinda – same gauge  as mainland Angola
  Gabon – no – break of gauge /
  Cameroon – no – break of gauge /
  Central African Republic – no – no railways

Cities served by rail

In the media
In 2012 the Congo–Ocean Railway was featured in an episode of the television series Chris Tarrant: Extreme Railways.

See also 
 Congo Railway
 Matadi-Kinshasa Railway in the Democratic Republic of the Congo.
 Railway stations in Congo
 List of countries by rail transport network size
 Transport in the Republic of the Congo

References

Further reading
 Daughton, J. P. (2021). In the Forest of No Joy: The Cong-Océan Railroad and the Tragedy of French Colonialism.

External links

A 2021 book, In the Forest of No Joy: The Congo-Océan Railroad and the Tragedy of French Colonialism  by J. P. Daughton (Norton, 384 pp), describes the gruesome toll taken on the African laborers who built the railroad in the 1920s and 30s. A brief review in The New Yorker notes that although the project "was championed as key to local development," over 20 000 of them "perished of starvation, disease, or physical abuse. Mostly forced laborers, they toiled without machinery, clearing forests by hand and turning rocks into gravel with hammers."   Publisher: https://wwnorton.com/books/9780393541014

Maps 
 UN Map
 reliefweb.int
 UNJLC Rail map of Southern Africa

French Equatorial Africa
Geography of Brazzaville
Pointe-Noire
3 ft 6 in gauge railways in the Republic of the Congo
History of the Republic of the Congo
Rail transport in the Republic of the Congo
1930s establishments in French Equatorial Africa